Baidurya Rahasya (Mystery of the Electric Gem) is a Bengali thriller movie directed by Tapan Sinha. This movie was released on 8 May 1985 under the banner of Saraswati Chitram. Storylining and music direction was also done by Tapan Sinha.

Plot 
An invaluable emerald was stolen from a Lord Krishna's temple in an island, that was insured for Rs. 8 lakhs. The insurance company appointed Hindusthan detective agency for investigation. The Head of the Detective agency Mr. Madan Bose went to the temple with his assistant to meet the Mohanta Maharaj of the temple. On the other hand, two young ladies went to the temple as devotee of lord Krishna. Without informing the local police they started investigation secretly. There are some mysterious person like young researcher, priest Nityananda, and Singh ji, trustee of the temple. When old garden keeper Charandas was brutally killed by a masked man in night, the police started a parallel investigation. Finally it revealed that not only theft but another murder was committed in the temple few days ago. True culprit was identified and the jewel retrieved at last.

Starring 
 Basanta Choudhury - Head of the Temple, Mohanta, and smuggler (dual role)
 Moon Moon Sen - Devotee/Rangita
 Alpana Goswami - Devotee/Sangita
 Manoj Mitra - Madan Bose, Head of Detective agency
 Tapas Paul - Researcher/Indrajit Sarkar, S.I.
 Dulal Lahiri - Mr. Rakhsit
 Nirmal Kumar - Prithish Ganguly, Manager of Insurance Company
 Ramen Roychoudhury - Nityananda
 Bhishma Guhathakurata - Assistant of Madan Bose
 Ujjal Sengupta - Mr. Ghosh, Police Inspector

Songs

References

External links
 

Bengali-language Indian films
Indian detective films
Indian crime thriller films
1980s crime thriller films
1980s Bengali-language films
Films directed by Tapan Sinha